Philautus surdus is a species of frog in the family Rhacophoridae. It is endemic to the Philippines and found on Bohol, Mindanao, Luzon, and Polillo islands.
Its natural habitats are lower montane and lowland forests, and it can also occur in some disturbed areas adjacent to forests. It is an arboreal species and one of the most common Philippine frogs inhabiting forests.

References

surdus
Amphibians of the Philippines
Endemic fauna of the Philippines
Fauna of Luzon
Fauna of Mindanao
Fauna of Bohol
Amphibians described in 1863
Taxa named by Wilhelm Peters
Taxonomy articles created by Polbot